Katie Baker (born April 21, 1984) is the captain of the Canadian Women's National Field Hockey Team and has over 80 caps to her name.

Career
Baker was introduced to field hockey at age 14 when her family moved to Hamilton, Ontario where she decided to try out for the highschool team. She draws inspiration from her family, and her neighbors at home in Prince Edward Island. A member of the senior national team since 2006 (junior national team from 2004 to 2005). Her first senior international cap was the 2006 UK Tour in Cardiff, Wales. She was named to the Pan American Elite team in 2009, and was also named PEI Female Athlete of the year (2009).She is currently the Captain of the Canadian National team and has been coached by Louis Mendonca since 2008. Past coaches include, Sally Bell, Sharon Rajaraman, and Jennifer Gillan.

Katie played professionally overseas for Royal Antwerp Hockey Club in the 2009–2010 season. Currently, Katie's training is based out of Vancouver, British Columbia, Canada.

Personal information
Baker was born in Charlottetown, Prince Edward Island on April 21, 1984. Katie attended Bluefield Highschool in Hampshire, Prince Edward Island, Canada. She plans to graduate in 2011 with a bachelor's degree in Sociology from Saint Mary's University, University of Prince Edward Island, and the University of British Columbia.

Competitions
 2010 San Diego Tour 
 2010 Commonwealth Games, Delhi (6th)
 2010 Chile Series, Vancouver
 2010 India Series, Vancouver
 2010 Belgian Champions 
 2010 World Cup Qualifier, San Diego (4th)
 2010 Chile and Argentina Tour
 2009 FIH Champions Challenge II, Russia (6th)
 2009 Pan American Cup, Bermuda (5th)
 2009 Ireland Tour
 2008 WorldHockey Olympic Qualifier, Vancouver
 2008 South Africa Tour
 2007 Pan American Games, Brazil (5th)
 2007 South Africa Tour
 2007 Women's Chile 4 Nations
 2007 AKPro Chile Series, Vancouver
 2005 Junior Women's World Cup, Chile
 2004 Chile Tour
 2004 UK Tour
 2006 UK & France Tour

References

External links
 

1984 births
Canadian female field hockey players
Field hockey players at the 2007 Pan American Games
Field hockey players at the 2010 Commonwealth Games
Field hockey players at the 2011 Pan American Games
Living people
Saint Mary's University (Halifax) alumni
Sportspeople from Charlottetown
Sportspeople from Hamilton, Ontario
University of British Columbia alumni
University of Prince Edward Island alumni
Commonwealth Games competitors for Canada
Pan American Games competitors for Canada